Milaki (also Romanized as Mīlakī, Meylakī, and Mīlekī; also known as Māliki) is a village in Behdasht Rural District, Kushk-e Nar District, Parsian County, Hormozgan Province, Iran. At the 2006 census, its population was 564, in 135 families.

References 

Populated places in Parsian County